Peter Pettinger is a 1925 novel by the British writer William Riley. In Yorkshire, a mechanic with strongly anti-capitalist views unexpectedly inherits a company and tries to run it on socialist lines.

Adaptation
In 1945 it was adapted into the film The Agitator produced by British National Films, directed by John Harlow and starring William Hartnell.

References

Bibliography
 Goble, Alan. The Complete Index to Literary Sources in Film. Walter de Gruyter, 199

1925 British novels
Novels by Willie Riley
British novels adapted into films
Herbert Jenkins books